The following is a list of ships that were built by Harland and Wolff, a heavy industrial company specialising in shipbuilding and offshore construction. It is based in Belfast, Northern Ireland, and had yards at Govan (1914–1963) and Greenock (1920–1928) in Scotland. The 1,600 ships are listed in order of the date of their launch. This list covers the period 1930–2002.

1930s
, cargo ship for British & African Steamship Co, launched 14 January 1930, completed 10 May 1930.
, cargo ship for Argentine Navigation Co, launched 28 January 1920, completed 27 May 1930.
, cargo ship for H Hogarth & Sons, launched 12 February 1930, completed 21 March 1930.
, cargo ship for Silver Line, launched 18 February 1930, completed 18 June 1930.
, cargo ship for British & African Steamship Co, launched 27 February 1930, completed 29 May 1930.
, cargo ship for British & African Steamship Co, launched 28 February 1930, completed 3 July 1930.
, ferry for City of Cork Steam Packet Co, launched 4 March 1930, completed 14 June 1930.
Celedonia, lighter for Argentine Navigation Co, launched 5 March 1930, completed 25 March 1930.
, cargo ship for Silver Line, launched 15 April 1930, completed 23 July 1930.
, cargo ship for H Hogarth & Sons, launched 17 March 1930, completed 17 April 1930.
, cargo ship for Richard Hughes & Co, launched 28 April 1930, completed 20 May 1930.
, cargo ship for British & African Steamship Co, launched 29 April 1930, completed 20 August 1930.
, cargo ship for Argentine Navigation Co, launched 8 May 1930, completed 17 September 1930.
, cargo ship for Richard Hughes & Co, launched 12 May 1930, completed 7 June 1930.
, asphalt carrier for Ebano Oil Co, launched 27 May 1930, completed 30 October 1930.
, cargo ship for Silver Line, launched 29 May 1930, completed 2 September 1930.
, cargo ship for Worms & Cie, launched 30 May 1930, completed 26 June 1930.
, cargo ship for Bank Line, launched 12 June 1930, completed 10 November 1930.
, cargo ship for Worms & Cie, launched 12 June 1930, completed 8 July 1930.
, ferry for Argentine Navigation Co, launched 26 June 1930, completed 14 November 1930.
, cargo ship for Silver Line, launched 26 June 1930, completed 19 September 1930.
, cargo ship for Argentine Navigation Co, launched 30 June 1930, completed 14 October 1930.
, cargo ship for French Line, launched 1 July 1930, completed 24 September 1930.
, cargo ship for Worms & Cie, launched 10 July 1930, completed 23 August 1930.
, cargo ship for Bank Line, launched 10 July 1930, completed 11 December 1930.
, cargo ship for Worms & Cie, launched 11 August 1930, completed 11 September 1930.
, cargo ship for French Line, launched 14 August 1930, completed 11 November 1930.
, cargo ship for Nourse Line, launched 26 August 1930, completed 29 October 1930, sunk by enemy action 1942.
, cargo ship for French Line, launched 11 September 1930, completed 10 December 1930.
, passenger ship for PSNC, launched 23 September 1930, completed 24 March 1931, scrapped 1958.
, cargo ship for Richard Hughes & Co, launched 25 September 1930, completed 24 October 1930.
, cargo ship for Hain Shipping Co, launched 9 October 1930, completed 18 December 1930.
, cargo ship for Richard Hughes & Co, launched 14 October 1930, completed 7 November 1930.
, ferry for Argentine Navigation Co, launched 22 October 1930, completed 25 January 1931.
, cargo ship for French Line, launched 23 October 1930, completed 23 January 1931.
, cargo ship for French Line, launched 20 November 1930, completed 6 March 1931.
, coaster for Clyde Shipping Co, launched 10 December 1930, completed 29 January 1931.
, cargo ship for French Line, launched 20 December 1930, completed 17 April 1931.
, cargo ship for British Phosphate Carriers, launched 22 January 1931, completed 21 March 1931.
, ferry for Southern Railways Co, launched 5 February 1931, completed 26 March 1931.
, stern-wheel paddle steamer for Elder Dempster, launched 5 March 1931, completed 17 April 1931.
, oil tanker for Anglo Saxon Petroleum Co, launched 14 May 1931, completed 14 October 1931.
, oil tanker for Lago Shipping Co, launched 21 May 1931, completed 16 June 1931.
, oil tanker for Anglo Saxon Petroleum Co, launched 2 July 1931, completed 22 December 1931.
, passenger ship for White Star Line, launched 12 November 1931, completed 10 June 1932, maiden voyage 25 June 1932, scrapped 1956.
, passenger ship for Nelson Steamship Co, launched 10 December 1931, completed 15 May 1932, torpedoed and sunk 1940.
East Goodwin, lightship for Trinity House, launched 23 December 1931, completed 13 April 1932.
, floating crane for Cowans, Sheldon & Co, launched 15 March 1932, completed 20 August 1932.
, ferry for Wallasey Corporation, launched 22 March 1932, completed 12 May 1932.
, cargo ship for H Hogarth & Sons, launched 4 May 1932, completed 4 June 1932.
, (Govan-built), Clyde steamer for Caledonian Steam Packet Co, launched 5 May 1932, completed 24 June 1932, scrapped 1974.
, ferry for Bombay Steam Navigation Co, launched 5 July 1932, completed 10 September 1932.
North Carr Lightship, (Clyde-built), lightship for Trinity House, launched 2 December 1932, completed 27 February 1933
, refrigerated cargo ship for Shaw Savill Line, launched 1 May 1934, completed 29 August 1934.
, ferry for Bombay Steam Navigation Co, launched 4 July 1933, completed 31 August 1933.
, cargo ship for H Hogarth & Sons, launched 9 August 1933, completed 22 September 1933.
, ferry for Bombay Steam Navigation Company, launched 17 August 1933, completed 28 September 1933.
, cargo ship for H Hogarth & Sons, launched 6 September 1933, completed 4 October 1933.
, yacht for Alan F Craig, launched 9 May 1934, completed 2 July 1934.
, target towing ship for British Admiralty, launched 14 June 1934, completed 12 September 1934.
, refrigerated cargo ship for Shaw Savill Line, launched 28 June 1934, completed 19 October 1934.
, tug for South African Railways, launched 26 July 1934, completed 9 October 1934.
, cargo ship for MacLay & MacIntyre Ltd, launched 16 August 1934, completed 21 September 1934.
, tug for Clyde Shipping Co, launched 20 August 1934, completed 15 September 1934.
, tug for South African Railways, launched 28 August 1934, completed 9 November 1934.
, refrigerated cargo ship for Blue Star Line, launched 9 October 1934, completed 29 December 1934.
, refrigerated cargo ship for Shaw Savill Line, launched 9 October 1934, completed 26 January 1935.
, cargo ship for P Henderson & Co, launched 11 October 1934, completed 22 November 1934.
, cargo ship for P Henderson & Co, launched 8 November 1934, completed 26 December 1934.
, refrigerated cargo ship for Blue Star Line, launched 22 November 1934, completed 1 March 1935.
, cargo ship for H Hogarth & Sons, launched 10 December 1934, completed 16 January 1935.
, oil tanker for Anglo Saxon Petroleum Co, launched 19 December 1934, completed 28 February 1935.
, refrigerated cargo ship for Union Castle, launched 20 December 1934, completed 4 May 1935, scrapped 1967.
, refrigerated cargo ship for Blue Star Line, launched 12 January 1935, completed 17 April 1935.
, coaster for Nyasaland Railways, delivered 1 February 1935.
, cargo ship for H Hogarth & Sons, launched 6 February 1935, completed 3 March 1935.
, passenger ship for Elder Dempster, launched 7 February 1935, completed 19 March 1935.
, oil tanker for Eagle Oil and Shipping Company, launched 19 February 1935, completed 17 April 1935.
, refrigerated cargo ship for Union Castle, launched 21 February 1935, completed 11 May 1935, ran aground and lost 1940.
, cargo ship for Christian Salvesen, launched 6 March 1935, completed 15 April 1935.
, paddle ferry for London and North Eastern Railway, launched 10 April 1935, completed 12 June 1935.
TSS Duke of York, ferry for London, Midland and Scottish Railway, launched 7 March 1935 completed 4 June 1935, renamed HMS Duke of Wellington 1942, Duke of York 1948, York 1963 and Fantasia 1964, scrapped 1976.
, cargo ship for T&J Harrison, launched 3 July 1935, completed 11 September 1935.
, passenger ship for Union Castle, launched 15 August 1935, completed 29 January 1936, maiden voyage 7 February 1936, scrapped 1966.
, refrigerated cargo ship for Blue Star Line, launched 26 September 1935, completed 20 December 1935.
, cruiser for British Admiralty, launched 15 October 1935, completed 15 November 1936, torpedoed and sunk 18 February 1944.
, passenger ship for Union Castle, launched 28 November 1935, completed 13 May 1936, maiden voyage 22 May 1936, scrapped 1965.
, passenger ship for McIlwraith & MacEachern Ltd, launched 12 December 1935, completed 26 April 1936.
, ferry for Bombay Steam Navigation Co, launched 26 November 1935, completed 21 February 1936.
, fruit carrier for Erin Steamship Co, launched 9 January 1936, completed 8 April 1936.
, oil tanker for Anglo Saxon Petroleum Co, launched 9 January 1936, completed 16 April 1936.
, refrigerated cargo ship for Blue Star Line, launched 11 January 1936, completed 19 March 1936.
, passenger ship for Union Castle, launched 25 January 1936, completed 27 June 1936, maiden voyage 10 July 1936, renamed Victoria 1958, The Victoria 1976 and Princesa Victoria 1993, scrapped 2004.
, oil tanker for Anglo Saxon Petroleum Co, launched 20 February 1936, completed 14 May 1936.
, ferry for Burns & Laird Line, launched 10 March 1936, completed 13 June 1936, renamed HMS Royal Ulsterman and Sounion, sunk by mine 3 March 1973.
, ferry for Burns & Laird Line, launched 11 March 1936, completed 29 May 1936, renamed HMS Royal Scotsman 1940 and Apollo 1967, scrapped 1984.
, passenger ship for Union Castle, launched 26 March 1936, completed 27 August 1936, renamed HMS Dunvegan Castle, torpedoed and sunk 1940.
, cargo ship for Huddart Parker, launched 5 May 1936, completed 18 July 1936.
, tug for McKie & Baxter Ltd, launched 13 May 1936, completed 15 July 1936.
, trawler for Lancashire Sea Fisheries, launched 27 May 1936, completed 17 July 1936.
, ferry for Bombay Steam Navigation Co, launched 14 July 1936, completed 17 September 1936.
, livestock carrier for Burns & Laird Line, launched 21 July 1936, completed 15 August 1936.
, livestock carrier for Burns & Laird Line, launched 6 August 1936, completed 26 August 1936.
, ferry for Belfast Harbour Commissioners, launched 25 August 1936, completed 17 March 1937.
, livestock carrier for Burns & Laird Line, launched 3 September 1936, completed 24 September 1936.
, (Clyde-built), oil tanker for British Tanker Company, launched 16 September 1936, completed 16 December 1936.
, cargo ship for Union Castle, launched 17 September 1936, completed 30 November 1936. Sunk 21 September 1941 while serving as a convoy rescue ship.
, collier for John Kelly Ltd, launched 6 October 1936, completed 28 November 1936 .
, (Clyde-built), oil tanker for British Tanker Company, launched 3 November 1936, completed 21 January 1937.
, cargo ship for Bank Line, launched 17 November 1936, completed 18 February 1937.
, coaster for William Robertson Ltd, launched 2 December 1936, completed 3 February 1937.
, oil tanker for Anglo Saxon Petroleum, launched 29 December 1936, completed 10 March 1937.
, lightship tender for Commissioners of Irish Lights, launched 14 January 1937, completed 30 March 1937.
, coaster for North Coast Steam Navigation Company, launched 27 January 1937, completed 7 April 1937.
, refrigerated cargo ship for Union Castle, launched 11 February 1937, completed 29 April 1937.
, cargo ship for Ulster Steamship Co, launched 25 February 1937, completed 10 April 1937.
, cargo ship for Donaldson Line, launched 11 March 1937, completed 17 August 1937.
, ferry for Union Steamship Co, launched 16 March 1937, completed 8 May 1937.
, refrigerated cargo ship for Union Castle, launched 25 March 1937, completed 26 June 1937.
, cargo ship for Lamport & Holt, launched 12 April 1937, completed 6 July 1937.
, oil tanker for British Tanker Company, launched 22 April 1937, completed 7 June 1937.
, (Clyde-built), oil tanker for British Tanker Company, launched 22 June 1937, completed 8 September 1937.
, ferry for British & Irish Steam Packet Co, launched 24 June 1937, completed 2 November 1937.
, collier for John Kelly Ltd, launched 5 August 1937, completed 9 September 1937.
, oil tanker for British Tanker Company, launched 2 September 1937, completed 3 November 1937.
RMMV Capetown Castle, passenger ship for Union Castle, launched 23 September 1937, completed 31 March 1938, scrapped 1967.
, cargo ship for Lamport & Holt, launched 21 October 1937, completed 17 January 1938.
, oil tanker for British Tanker Co, launched 27 October 1937, completed 19 January 1938.
, ferry for British & Irish Steam Packet Co, launched 3 November 1937, completed 22 February 1938.
, (Clyde-built), oil tanker for British Tanker Company, launched 4 November 1937, completed 29 December 1937, torpedoed and sunk 23 May 1941.
, cargo ship for West Australian Government, launched 16 December 1937, completed 2 April 1938.
, cargo ship for Lamport & Holt, launched 21 December 1937, completed 14 February 1938.
, cargo ship for Royal Mail Line, launched 3 March 1938, completed 29 July 1938.
, cruiser for British Admiralty, launched 17 March 1938, completed 3 August 1939, museum ship 1971.
, oil tanker for Anglo Saxon Petroleum Co, launched 28 April 1938, completed 7 July 1938.
, cargo ship for Shaw Savill Line, launched 31 May 1938, completed 6 October 1938.
, passenger ship for Union Castle, launched 14 June 1938, completed 15 December 1938.
, oil tanker for Anglo Saxon Petroleum Company, launched 28 June 1938, completed 14 September 1938, scrapped 1962.
, oil tanker for British Tanker Company, launched 25 August 1938, completed 26 October 1938.
, passenger ship for Union Castle, launched 12 October 1938, completed 18 April 1939, renamed HMS Pretoria Castle 1939 and Warwick Castle 1946, scrapped 1962.
, oil tanker for British Admiralty, launched 25 October 1938, completed 26 January 1939, sunk on 30 May 1941.
, refrigerated cargo ship for Union Castle, launched 8 November 1938, completed 11 February 1939.
, refrigerated cargo ship for Union Castle, launched 8 December 1938, completed 11 March 1939.
, oil tanker for Eagle Oil Co, launched 20 December 1938, completed 5 April 1939.
, coaster for North Coast Navigation Co, launched 25 January 1939, completed 15 March 1939.
, passenger ship for Royal Mail Line, launched 7 March 1939, completed 24 September 1939, scrapped 1971.
, ferry for Government of Fiji, delivered 18 April 1939.
, refrigerated cargo ship for Blue Star Line, launched 20 April 1939, completed 24 August 1939.
, tug for Government of South Africa, launched and completed 23 May 1939.
, refrigerated cargo ship for Blue Star Line, launched 20 June 1939, completed 4 November 1939.
, tug for Government of South Africa, launched 6 July 1939, completed 1 November 1939.
, passenger ship for Shaw Savill Line, launched 1 August 1939, completed 24 November 1939.
, aircraft carrier for British Admiralty, launched 17 August 1939, completed 24 November 1940, scrapped 1953.
, (Clyde-built),  for British Admiralty, launched 12 December 1939, completed 9 March 1940. Converted to pilot tender Helm in 1946, and to Mozambique as Magul in 1948.

1940s
, (Clyde-built), Tree-class trawler for British Admiralty, launched 27 January 1940, completed 30 April 1940.
,  for British Admiralty, launched 14 February 1940, completed 5 April 1940, renamed USS Saucy 1942, HMS Snapdragon 1945, SS Katina 1947 and SS Tewfik 1950.
, Flower-class corvette for British Admiralty, launched 24 February 1940, completed 8 April 1940, renamed USS Restless 1942, Perilock 1947, scrapped 1953.
, Flower-class corvette for British Admiralty, launched 7 March 1940, completed 22 April 1940, scrapped 1947.
, Flower-class corvette for British Admiralty, launched 21 March 1940, completed 6 May 1940, renamed USS Ready 1942, Villa Cisneros 1948 and Villa Bens 1949.
, cargo ship for Court Line, launched 21 March 1940, completed 26 June 1940.
, Flower-class corvette for British Admiralty, launched 21 March 1940, completed 5 September 1940, torpedoed and sunk 12 August 1941.
, cargo ship for Lamport & Holt, launched 23 March 1940, completed 23 May 1940.
, Flower-class corvette for British Admiralty, launched 6 April 1940, completed 21 May 1940, renamed USS Spry 1942 and Madonna 1947, scrapped 1955.
, Flower-class corvette for British Admiralty, launched 20 April 1940, completed 4 June 1940, renamed USS Courage 1942, Roskva 1951, Douglas 1956 and Seabird 1958, sunk December 1958.
, paddle steamer for London & North Eastern Railway, launched 27 April 1940, completed 4 July 1941.
, Flower-class corvette for British Admiralty, launched 4 May 1940, completed 18 June 1940, renamed Hetty W Vinke 1948, scrapped 1965.
, refrigerated cargo ship for Royal Mail Line, launched 21 May 1940, completed 15 August 1940.
, Flower-class corvette for British Admiralty, launched 22 May 1940, completed 2 July 1940, renamed Nada 1944, Partizanka 1946 and El Sudan 1948.
, (Govan-built),  for British Admiralty, launched 23 May 1940, completed 4 November 1940, renamed KNM Glomma 1945.
, (Clyde-built), Flower-class corvette for British Admiralty, launched 23 May 1940, completed 17 August 1940, scrapped 1952.
, cargo ship for T&J Harrison, launched 4 June 1940, completed 8 August 1940.
, Flower-class corvette for British Admiralty, launched 4 June 1940, completed 2 August 1940, renamed BP Sachtouris 1943, scrapped 1952.
, cargo ship for Bank Line, launched 6 June 1940, completed 24 October 1940.
, Flower-class corvette for British Admiralty, launched 18 June 1940, completed 9 August 1940, sunk by mine 9 February 1943.
, cargo ship for Lamport & Holt, launched 20 June 1940, completed 30 August 1940.
, (Clyde-built), Flower-class corvette for British Admiralty, launched 26 June 1940, completed 20 October 1940, renamed Annlock, scrapped 1952.
, Flower-class corvette for British Admiralty, launched 2 July 1940, completed 22 August 1940, scrapped 1947.
, Bangor-class minesweeper for British Admiralty, launched 4 July 1940, completed 7 February 1941.
, cargo ship for Bank Line, launched 20 July 1940, completed 5 December 1940.
, Flower-class corvette for British Admiralty, launched 6 August 1940, completed 22 September 1940, scrapped 1947.
, oil tanker for British Admiralty, launched 22 August 1940, completed 27 January 1941, renamed Petrola XIV 1973, scrapped 1979.
, cargo ship for Ulster Steamship Co, launched 3 September 1940, completed 19 December 1940.
, refrigerated cargo ship for Royal Mail Line, launched 4 September 1940, completed 19 November 1940.
, (Clyde-built), Flower-class corvette for British Admiralty, launched 31 October 1940, completed 27 February 1941, renamedThessaloniki 1946.
, refrigerated cargo ship for Royal Mail Line, launched 2 November 1940, completed 23 January 1941.
, submarine depot ship for British Admiralty, launched 30 November 1940, completed 28 February 1942, scrapped 1970.
, oil tanker for British Admiralty, launched 12 December 1940, completed 11 April 1941, scrapped 1975.
, refrigerated cargo ship for Royal Mail Line, launched 14 January 1941, completed 2 April 1941.
, oil tanker for British Admiralty, launched 29 January 1941, completed 6 June 1941, renamed Korytsa 1972, scrapped 1987.
, (Clyde-built), Flower-class corvette for British Admiralty, launched 12 February 1941, completed 26 May 1941, renamed Southern Broom 1948, scrapped 1967.
RFA Dingledale, (Govan-built),  for British Admiralty, launched 27 March 1941, completed 10 September 1941, renamed Royaumont 1959, scrapped 1967.
, refrigerated cargo ship for Ministry of Shipping, launched 27 March 1941, completed 22 October 1941, sunk by enemy action 11 August 1942.
, (Govan-built), oil tanker for British Admiralty, launched 29 May 1941, completed 24 October 1941, torpedoed and sunk 24 January 1942.
, oil tanker for Ministry of War Transport, launched 10 July 1941, completed 12 November 1941, renamed Norsol 1942, Kollbjørg 1946 and Storo 1956, scrapped 1959.
, (Clyde-built),  for British Admiralty, launched 31 July 1940, completed 12 November 1940.
, Flower-class corvette for British Admiralty, launched 19 August 1940, completed 3 October 1940, renamed Apostolis 1943, scrapped 1952.
, (Clyde-built), Dance-class trawler for British Admiralty, launched 29 August 1940, completed 2 January 1941.
, Flower-class corvette for British Admiralty, launched 2 September 1940, completed 18 October 1940, renamed Maj Vinke 1950.
, Flower-class corvette for British Admiralty, launched 17 September 1940, completed 1 November 1940, scrapped 1947.
, Flower-class corvette for British Admiralty, launched 3 October 1940, completed 19 November 1940, renamed Freelock 1946, sunk 1 April 1947.
, Flower-class corvette for British Admiralty, launched 15 October 1940, completed 29 November 1940, mined and sunk 21 August 1944.
, Flower-class corvette for British Admiralty, launched 31 October 1940, completed 3 January 1941, renamed Rubis 1947 and Seislim 1954, scrapped 1959.
, (Clyde-built), coaster for Ministry of Shipping, launched 13 November 1940, completed 2 April 1941, renamed Borthwick 1947, Agostino in 1960 and Ivy in 1972.
, Flower-class corvette for British Admiralty, launched 16 November 1940, completed 16 June 1942, renamed HNoMS Polarfront II 1947.
, Flower-class corvette for British Admiralty, launched 16 November 1940, completed 9 January 1941, scrapped October 1948.
, Flower-class corvette for British Admiralty, launched 28 November 1940, completed 3 February 1941, renamed Kraft 1948 and Arne Skontorp 1954, scrapped 1966.
, Tank Landing Craft for British Admiralty, launched 9 December 1940, completed 16 December 1940.
, Tank Landing Craft for British Admiralty, launched 9 December 1940, completed 16 December 1940.
, Flower-class corvette for British Admiralty, launched 17 December 1940, completed 13 February 1941, renamed Laconia 1949, Constantinos S 1950 and Parnon 1952, sunk 16 July 1954.
, Flower-class corvette for British Admiralty, launched 15 January 1941, completed 1 March 1941, renamed Silverlord 1949 and Sir Edgar 1954, scrapped 1960.
, Flower-class corvette for British Admiralty, launched 16 January 1941, completed 28 March 1941, renamed Deppie 1948, Canastel 1950, Rio Blanco 1952 and Lillian 1955.
, Flower-class corvette for British Admiralty, launched 12 February 1941, completed 11 April 1941, scrapped 24 May 1946.
, (Govan-built), coaster for Ministry of Shipping, launched 13 February 1941, completed 17 June 1941, renamedAngularity 1946 and Elpis 1967, sank 1968.
, Flower-class corvette for British Admiralty, launched 15 February 1941, completed 9 May 1941, renamed Syros 1947, Delphini 1951 and Ekaterina 1955, scrapped 1974.
, Tank Landing Craft for British Admiralty, launched 11 March 1941, completed 25 March 1941.
, Tank Landing Craft for British Admiralty, launched 11 March 1941, completed 25 March 1941.
, Flower-class corvette for British Admiralty, launched 12 March 1941, completed 9 June 1941, torpedoed and sunk 20 February 1945.
,  for British Admiralty, launched 20 March 1941, completed 28 June 1941.
, Flower-class corvette for British Admiralty, launched 10 April 1941, completed 24 April 1942, renamed HNoMS Buttercup 1944, HNoMS Nordkyn 1946 and Thoris 1956, scrapped 1969.
, Flower-class corvette for British Admiralty, launched 11 April 1941, completed 26 January 1942, renamedCommandant Drogou 1942, Terje 10 1947 and NRP Caravalho Araujo 1959.
, Shakesperian-class trawler for British Admiralty, launched 3 May 1941, completed 20 October 1941.
, Flower-class corvette for British Admiralty, launched 28 May 1941, completed 9 August 1941, scrapped 1949.
, Tank Landing Craft for British Admiralty, launched 9 June 1941, completed 29 June 1941.
, Tank Landing Craft for British Admiralty, launched 9 June 1941, completed 11 July 1941.
, Flower-class corvette for British Admiralty, launched 11 June 1941, completed 27 August 1941, renamed Soroy 1946.
, Tank Landing Craft for British Admiralty, launched 17 June 1941, completed 31 August 1941.
, Tank Landing Craft for British Admiralty, launched 17 June 1941, completed 16 September 1941.
, (Govan-built), oil tanker for Ministry of War Transport, launched 21 August 1941, completed 25 December 1941, renamed Nortind 1942, torpedoed and sunk 16 January 1943.
, refrigerated cargo ship for Ministry of War Transport, launched 25 August 1941, completed 1 April 1942, scrapped 1963.
RFA Derwentdale, (Govan-built), landing ship gantry for British Admiralty, launched 12 April 1941, completed 30 August 1941, renamed Irvingdale I 1959, scrapped 1966.
, (Clyde-built), coaster for Ministry of War Transport, launched 26 June 1941, completed 23 September 1941, renamed Peregrine 1946, Libya 1965 and Rozmary 1971.
, Flower-class corvette for British Admiralty, launched 22 July 1941, completed 31 October 1941, renamed Andria 1947 and V.D. Chidambaram 1949, scrapped 1955.
, Flower-class corvette for British Admiralty, launched 24 July 1941, completed 18 December 1941, scrapped 1961.
, (Clyde-built), Flower-class corvette for British Admiralty, launched 28 August 1941, completed 27 December 1941, renamed LÉ Maev 1946.
, cargo ship for Ministry of War Transport, launched 4 September 1941, completed 7 May 1942, renamed Van der Helst 1943, Tjimenteng 1946 and Diamandis 1963, scrapped 1970.
, coaster for Ministry of War Transport, launched 9 September 1941, completed 30 October 1941, renamed Starkenborgh 1942, Spaarnestroom 1947, Erato Sartes 1961 and Antonios P 1963, scrapped July 1969.
, (Clyde-built), Flower-class corvette for British Admiralty, launched 18 October 1941, completed 5 March 1942, scrapped 1949.
, oil tanker for Ministry of War Transport, launched 21 October 1941, completed 11 April 1942 as RFA Dinsdale, torpedoed and sunk 31 May 1942.
MV Empire Ballantyne, (Clyde-built), cargo ship for Ministry of War Transport, launched 21 October 1941, completed 25 February 1942, renamed MV Belgian Airman 1942, torpedoed and sunk 14 April 1945.
, aircraft maintenance carrier for British Admiralty, launched 20 November 1941, completed 12 March 1943, scrapped 1959.
, cargo ship for Ministry of War Transport, launched 18 December 1941, completed 1 September 1942, renamed Medon 1946 and Tina 1963, scrapped 1970.
,  for British Admiralty, launched 22 December 1941, completed 24 March 1942, torpedoed and sunk 15 November 1942.
MV Empire Bede, (Govan-built), cargo ship for Ministry of War Transport, launched 6 January 1942, completed 31 March 1942, torpedoed and sunk 18 August 1942.
MV Empire Chapman, oil tanker for Ministry of War Transport, launched 17 January 1942, completed 25 June 1942, renamed British Commando 1946, scrapped 1959.
, Algerine-class minesweeper for British Admiralty, launched 5 February 1942, completed 16 May 1942, lost 2 January 1943.
, oil tanker for Ministry of War Transport, launched 17 February 1942, completed 29 April 1942, torpedoed and sunk 8 December 1942.
, (Govan-built), oil tanker for Ministry of War Transport, launched 18 February 1942, completed 23 May 1942. Later renamed Empire Vigilance, torpedoed and sunk 24 January 1943.
,  for British Admiralty, launched 4 March 1942, completed 24 April 1942.
, refrigerated cargo ship for Royal Mail Line, launched 17 March 1942, completed 28 November 1942.
, Algerine-class minesweeper for British Admiralty, launched 2 April 1942, completed 16 June 1942.
, Isles-trawler for British Admiralty, launched 3 April 1942, completed 15 June 1942.
, oil tanker for Ministry of War Transport, launched 4 April 1942, completed 31 July 1942, renamed Backhuysen 1944, Chama 1947 and Anastasia 1955, scrapped 1959.
, Algerine-class minesweeper for British Admiralty, launched 14 April 1942, completed 30 July 1942.
, oil tanker for British Tanker Co, launched 16 April 1942, completed 9 July 1942.
, Algerine-class minesweeper for British Admiralty, launched 27 May 1942, completed 9 September 1942.
, cargo ship for Ministry of War Transport, launched 28 May 1942, completed 22 December 1942, renamed Saxon Star 1946, Redbrook 1961 and MV E Evangelia 1965, ran aground and lost 15 October 1968.
, oil tanker for Eagle Oil Co, launched 30 May 1942, completed 31 December 1942.
, Algerine-class minesweeper for British Admiralty, launched 27 June 1942, completed 16 October 1942.
, Algerine-class minesweeper for British Admiralty, launched 12 August 1942, completed 1 December 1942.
,  for British Admiralty, launched 27 August 1942, completed 20 November 1943, renamed HMNZS Black Prince 1946, scrapped 1962.
, cargo ship for Ministry of War Transport, launched 27 August 1942, completed 31 January 1943, renamed Gothic Star 1946, Nelson Star 1948, Patagonia Star 1958, Eirini 1961 and Byzantium 1970, scrapped 8 July 1971.
, Algerine-class minesweeper for British Admiralty, launched 22 September 1942, completed 22 January 1943.
, Algerine-class minesweeper for British Admiralty, launched 10 October 1942, completed 26 February 1943, scrapped 1967.
, ferry for Nyasaland Railway Co, delivered 23 October 1942.
, Algerine-class minesweeper for British Admiralty, launched 27 October 1942, completed 26 March 1943.
, refrigerated cargo ship for Royal Mail Line, launched 21 November 1942, completed 29 June 1943.
, Algerine-class minesweeper for British Admiralty, launched 9 December 1942, completed 22 April 1943 and renamed HMS Loyalty, sunk 22 August 1944.
, Algerine-class minesweeper for British Admiralty, launched 11 January 1943, completed 21 May 1943.
, Algerine-class minesweeper for British Admiralty, launched 20 March 1943, completed 18 June 1943.
, Algerine-class minesweeper for British Admiralty, launched 3 April 1943, completed 9 July 1943.
, Algerine-class minesweeper for British Admiralty, launched 20 April 1943, completed 20 August 1943.
,  for British Admiralty, launched 17 June 1943, completed 7 March 1944, scrapped 1955.
, Algerine-class minesweeper for British Admiralty, launched 19 June 1943, completed 10 September 1943, sunk 26 July 1945.
, cargo ship for Royal Mail Line, launched 25 September 1943, completed 1 February 1944.
, refrigerated cargo ship for Union Castle, launched 23 December 1942, completed 23 April 1943.
, (Clyde-built), oil tanker for Ministry of War Transport, launched 20 December 1941, completed 10 March 1942, bombed and sunk 14 June 1943, raised and repaired 1948, renamed Asteria 1953 and Sanjacopo 1958, scrapped 1974.
, (Clyde-built),  for British Admiralty, launched 24 June 1942, completed 4 December 1942, scrapped 1957.
, (Govan-built), oil tanker for Ministry of War Transport, launched 30 June 1942, completed 24 September 1942, bombed and sunk 2 January 1943, raised and scrapped 1950.
, oil tanker for Ministry of War Transport, launched 8 August 1942, completed 18 February 1943 as MV Empire Bombardier, renamed  British Bombardier 1946, scrapped 1959.
, (Clyde-built), oil tanker for Ministry of War Transport, launched 31 August 1942, completed 11 November 1942, renamed INS Sambhar 1948.
, cargo ship for Ministry of War Transport, launched 23 September 1942, completed 17 March 1943, renamed King Robert 1946, Ardgem 1961 and Kelso 1967, scrapped 1969.
, oil tanker for Eagle Oil Co, launched 23 September 1942, completed 30 December 1942.
, tank landing craft for British Admiralty, launched 24 September 1942, completed 14 March 1943.
, tank landing craft for British Admiralty, launched 24 October 1942, completed 2 April 1943.
, (Clyde-built), cargo ship for Ministry of War Transport, launched 29 October 1942, completed 29 December 1942, renamed Argos Hill 1948, Queen Maud 1951, Scotia 1954 and Skotia 1960, scrapped 1962.
, oil tanker for Ministry of War Transport, launched 24 November 1942, completed 20 April 1943, renamed Athelqueen 1946 and Mariverda 1955, scrapped 1961.
, (Clyde-built), River-class frigate for British Admiralty, launched 24 November 1942, completed 28 April 1943, torpedoed and sunk 1944.
, tank landing craft for British Admiralty, launched 12 December 1942, completed 1 May 1943, scrapped 1958.
, (Clyde-built), cargo ship for Ministry of War Transport, launched 23 December 1942, completed 23 February 1943.
, (Clyde-built), oil tanker for Ministry of War Transport, launched 26 December 1942, completed 21 April 1943, renamed Kleinella 1946, Shellbrit 1948, BP Marketer 1952 and Sarroch 1964, scrapped September 1983.
, (Clyde-built), Isles-class trawler for the British Admiralty, launched 26 January 1943, completed 22 May 1943.
, oil tanker for Anglo Saxon Petroleum Co, launched 7 February 1943, completed 28 May 1943.
, oil tanker for British tanker Co, launched 23 March 1943, completed 15 June 1943.
, cargo ship for PSNC, launched 23 March 1943, completed 9 August 1943.
, (Clyde-built), oil tanker for Ministry of War Transport, launched 27 March 1943, completed 22 June 1943.
, oil tanker for Ministry of War Transport, launched 4 May 1943, completed 16 September 1943.
, cargo ship for Ministry of War Transport, launched 31 May 1943, completed 31 July 1943, renamed Pilote Garnier 1945 and Kyra Hariklia 1960, scrapped 1966.
, (Govan-built), merchant aircraft carrier for British Admiralty, launched 17 June 1943, completed 5 October 1943, renamed British Swordfish 1946, scrapped 1959.
, oil tanker for Ministry of War Transport, launched 29 June 1943, completed 28 October 1943, renamed Pechelbronn 1946, Eagle 1956 and Jajce 1959, scrapped 1969.
HMCS Ontario,  for British Admiralty, launched 29 July 1943, completed 25 May 1945, scrapped 1960.
, Algerine-class minesweeper for British Admiralty, launched 3 August 1943, completed 15 October 1943.
, (Clyde-built), River-class frigate for British Admiralty, launched 4 August 1943, completed 31 December 1943, renamed HMCS Meon 1944, scrapped 1966.
, cargo ship for PSNC, launched 17 August 1943, completed 28 October 1943.
, Algerine-class minesweeper for British Admiralty, launched 19 August 1943, completed 12 November 1943.
, oil tanker for Anglo Saxon Petroleum Co, launched 31 August 1943, completed 3 December 1943.
, refrigerated cargo ship for Shaw Savill Line, launched 20 September 1943, completed 29 October 1944.
, (Clyde-built), River-class frigate for British Admiralty, launched 5 June 1943, completed 15 October 1943, scrapped 1957.
, (Clyde-built), Flower-class corvette for Royal Canadian Navy, launched 28 September 1943, completed 15 January 1944, renamed Rexton Kent II 1947 and Rexton Kent, scuttled 1966.
, Algerine-class minesweeper for British Admiralty, launched 29 September 1943, completed 10 December 1943.
, oil tanker for Anglo Saxon Petroleum Co, launched 14 October 1943, completed 3 March 1944.
, Algerine-class minesweeper for British Admiralty, launched 26 October 1943, completed 14 January 1944.
, oil tanker for Eagle Oil Co, launched 2 November 1943, completed 30 December 1943.
, (Clyde-built), oil tanker for Ministry of War Transport, launched 10 November 1943, completed 30 December 1943, renamed Shellbrit 5 1946 and BP Engineer in 1952, scrapped June 1965.
, oil tanker for Anglo Saxon Petroleum Co, launched 14 November 1943, completed 30 March 1944.
, Algerine-class minesweeper for British Admiralty, launched 25 November 1943, completed 11 February 1944, scrapped 1972.
,  for British Admiralty, launched 27 November 1943, completed 2 April 1945, scrapped 1961.
,  for British Admiralty, launched 11 December 1943, completed 10 March 1944, scrapped 1960.
, refrigerated cargo ship for Royal Mail Line, launched 30 December 1943, completed 25 July 1944.
, Castle-class corvette for British Admiralty, launched 11 January 1944, completed 10 June 1944, renamed Weather Monitor 1962 and Admiral Beaufort 1976, scrapped 1982.
, cargo ship for Royal Mail Line, launched 20 January 1944, completed 8 July 1944.
, cargo ship for Ministry of War Transport, launched 25 January 1944, completed 30 May 1944, renamed Homer City 1947, Grosvenor Mariner 1966 and Red Sea 1966, scrapped 1971.
, (Clyde-built), River-class frigate for British Admiralty, launched 28 January 1944, completed 11 May 1944, renamed Halladale 1949, Norden 1962 and Turist Expressen 1962.
, cargo ship for Royal Mail Line, launched 8 February 1944, completed 7 September 1944.
, Castle-class corvette for British Admiralty, launched 8 February 1944, completed 26 June 1944 as HMCS Arnprior, renamed Montevideo 1946.
, Castle-class corvette for British Admiralty, launched 24 February 1944, completed 14 July 1944, renamed HMCS Petrolia 1944.
, refrigerated cargo ship for Union Castle, launched 23 March 1944, completed 28 September 1944.
RFA Wave King, (Govan-built), oil tanker for British Admiralty, launched 6 April 1944, completed 22 July 1944, scrapped 1960.
, cargo ship for Lamport & Holt, launched 12 April 1944, completed 20 August 1944.
, Castle-class corvette for British Admiralty, launched 12 April 1944, completed 20 September 1944 as HMCS Humberstone.
, Algerine-class minesweeper for British Admiralty, launched 20 April 1944, completed 16 August 1944, mined and scuttled 24 July 1945.
, Algerine-class minesweeper for British Admiralty, launched 6 May 1944, completed 14 September 1944.
, oil tanker for Ministry of War Transport, launched 6 May 1944, completed 20 September 1944, renamed Nayadis 1946, scrapped 1961.
, (Clyde-built), oil tanker for Ministry of War Transport, launched 15 May 1944, completed 26 June 1944, renamed Allurity 1947, scrapped 1966.
, (Clyde-built), cargo ship for Ministry of War Transport, launched 19 May 1944, completed 10 July 1945, renamed King Edgar 1946, scrapped 1959.
, Colossus-class aircraft carrier for British Admiralty, launched 20 May 1944, completed 14 March 1946, renamed HMCS Warrior 1946 and ARA Independencia 1958, scrapped 1971.
, Algerine-class minesweeper for British Admiralty, launched 22 May 1944, completed 13 October 1944.
,  for British Admiralty, launched 23 May 1944, completed 15 June 1944, scrapped 1963.
, Loch-class frigate for British Admiralty, launched 8 June 1944, completed 7 July 1944, renamed Orion 1961.
, Algerine-class minesweeper for British Admiralty, launched 20 June 1944, completed 10 November 1944, renamed HMNS Nigeria 1959.
, Loch-class frigate for British Admiralty, launched 6 July 1944, completed 9 September 1945, scrapped 1970.
, oil tanker for British Admiralty, launched 6 July 1944, completed 3 November 1944.
, Algerine-class minesweeper for British Admiralty, launched 20 July 1944, completed 9 December 1944.
, (Clyde-built), Castle-class corvette for British Admiralty, launched 20 July 1944, completed 10 December 1944, renamed Weather Reporter 1957.
, Loch-class frigate for British Admiralty, launched 2 August 1944, completed 2 January 1945 as HMSAS Transvaal for South African Navy, scuttled 1978.
, oil tanker for Anglo Saxon Petroleum Co, launched 3 August 1944, completed 20 December 1944.
, Algerine-class minesweeper for British Admiralty, launched 22 August 1944, completed 18 January 1945.
, (Clyde-built), oil tanker for Ministry of War Transport, launched 28 August 1944, completed 16 October 1944, renamed Samshoo 1946, Pass of Glenogle 1951, Marcello Garolla 1961 and Marcello G 1969, scrapped 1979.
, cargo ship for Ministry of War Transport, launched 2 September 1944, completed 21 February 1945, maiden voyage 25 February 1945, renamed Stirlingshire 1946, scrapped 1966.
, landing ship, tank for British Admiralty, launched 3 September 1944, completed 15 September 1944.
, refrigerated cargo ship for Royal Mail Line, launched 5 September 1944, completed 20 December 1944.
, landing ship, tank for British Admiralty, launched 16 September 1944, completed 28 September 1944.
, (Govan-built), oil tanker for Ministry of War Transport, launched 21 September 1944, completed 29 December 1944, renamed Saint Gaudens 1946, Sevane 1948 and Progres 1958, scrapped in 1970.
, landing ship, tank for British Admiralty, launched 30 September 1944, completed 5 April 1945.
, (Clyde-built), oil tanker for Ministry of War Transport, launched 19 October 1944, completed 22 December 1944, renamed Miliana 1946, Rivoli 1948, Pass of Drumochter 1952 and Santa Giulia 1962, scrapped 1971.
,  for British Admiralty, launched 19 October 1944, completed 13 April 1945, scrapped 1957.
, landing ship, tank for British Admiralty, launched 31 October 1944, completed 4 May 1945.
, landing ship, tank for British Admiralty, launched 31 October 1944, completed 6 June 1945.
, refrigerated cargo ship for Union Castle, launched 31 October 1944, completed 14 February 1945.
HMS Magnificent,  for British Admiralty, launched 16 November 1944, completed 21 May 1948 and delivered as HMCS Magnificent, scrapped 1965.
, oil tanker for Anglo Saxon petroleum Co, launched 17 November 1944, completed 22 March 1945.
, Bay-class frigate for British Admiralty, launched 18 November 1944, completed 29 May 1945, scrapped 1959.
, Bay-class frigate for British Admiralty, launched 16 December 1944, completed 30 July 1945, scrapped 1956.
, (Clyde-built), oil tanker for Ministry of War Transport, launched 30 November 1944, completed 26 February 1945, renamed Alchymist 1950, scrapped 1969.
, refrigerated cargo ship for Ministry of War Transport, launched 30 December 1944, completed 30 June 1945, renamed Rakaia 1946, scrapped 1971.
, landing ship, tank for British Admiralty, launched 30 December 1944, completed 11 May 1945.
, Bay-class frigate for British Admiralty, launched 16 January 1945, completed 15 June 1945, scrapped 1962.
, (Clyde-built), oil tanker for Ministry of War Transport, launched 19 January 1945, completed 11 April 1945, renamed Adib 1948 and BP Transporter 1952, scrapped 1965.
, landing ship, tank for British Admiralty, launched 31 January 1945, completed 16 November 1945.
, landing ship, tank for British Admiralty, launched 12 February 1945, completed 14 August 1945.
, Bay-class frigate for British Admiralty, launched 15 February 1945, completed 6 September 1945, scrapped 1958.
HMS Powerful, Majestic-class aircraft carrier for British Admiralty, launched 27 February 1945, completed 21 January 1957 as HMCS Bonaventure, scrapped 1971.
, cargo ship for Lamport & Holt, launched 28 February 1945, completed 31 May 1945.
, landing ship, tank for British Admiralty, launched 12 March 1945, completed 25 September 1945.
, (Clyde-built), oil tanker for Ministry of War Transport, launched 16 March 1945, completed 19 June 1945, renamed Aqueity 1947, sunk by mine 1947.
, oil tanker for British Tanker Co, launched 29 March 1945, completed 7 June 1945.
, Bay-class frigate for British Admiralty, launched 29 March 1945, completed 11 October 1945, scrapped 1959.
, landing ship, tank for British Admiralty, launched 24 April 1945, completed 24 November 1945.
, Bay-class frigate for British Admiralty, launched 26 April 1945, completed 19 January 1946, scrapped 1959.
, refrigerated cargo ship for Ministry of War Transport, launched 14 May 1945, completed 26 October 1945, renamed Tuscan Star 1947, Timaru Star 1948 and California Star 1959, scrapped 1969.
, oil tanker for British Tanker Co, launched 26 July 1945, completed 21 December 1945.
, (Clyde-built), oil tanker for Ministry of War Transport, launched 31 July 1945, completed 19 September 1945, renamed Fulgar 1946, Shelbrit 9 1948 and BP Manager 1952, scrapped 1967.
, cargo ship for Royal Mail Line, launched 21 August 1945, completed 14 December 1945.
, aircraft carrier for British Admiralty, launched 22 September 1945 by Vickers-Armstrong, completed 1957 by Harland and Wolff and delivered as INS Vikrant 1961, scrapped 2014
, refrigerated cargo ship for Union Castle, launched 23 October 1945, completed 11 March 1946.
, oil tanker for Anglo Saxon Petroleum Co, completed 24 January 1946.
, refrigerated cargo ship for Port Line, launched 5 December 1945, completed 29 August 1946.
, oil tanker for British Tanker Co, launched 20 December 1945, completed 11 April 1946.
, cargo ship for PSNC, launched 17 January 1946, completed 2 May 1946.
, refrigerated cargo ship for Union Castle, launched 5 March 1946, completed 25 June 1946.
, (Clyde-built), oil tanker for Ministry of War Transport, launched 30 April 1945, completed 14 August 1945, renamed Anonity 1947, Petrola II 1966 and Kalymnos 1969, scrapped 1970.
, (Clyde-built), oil tanker for Ministry of War Transport, launched 12 June 1945, completed 9 October 1945, renamed Alignity 1952, scrapped 1971.
, (Clyde-built), oil tanker for Ministry of War Transport, launched 14 August 1945, completed 27 November 1945, renamed Frenulina 1947, Anlok 1962, Permina VI 1962 and Bimoli 01 1974.
, oil tanker for Ministry of War Transport, launched 20 October 1945, completed 4 February 1946, renamed Fischeria 1947, Acuity 1951, Vittoriosa 1967 and Neptunia 1969, scrapped 1975.
, (Clyde-built), oil tanker for Ministry of War Transport, launched 30 November 1945, completed 12 March 1946, renamed Felipes 1947, Shelbrit 10 1948 and Shell Director 1952, scrapped 1966.
, (Clyde-built), oil tanker for Ministry of War Transport, launched 5 February 1946, completed 7 May 1946, renamed Fusinus 1947 and Aqueity 1949, scrapped 1965.
, cargo ship for Ministry of War Transport, launched 4 March 1946, completed 18 December 1946 as Empire Star for Blue Star Line, scrapped 1971.
, oil tanker for Anglo Saxon Petroleum Co, launched 6 March 1946, completed 20 June 1946.
,  for British Admiralty, launched 19 March 1946, completed 31 October 1951, scrapped 1978.
, (Clyde-built), oil tanker for Ministry of War Transport, launched April 1946, completed 6 September 1946, renamed Fusus 1947, Monaco 1964 and Hanna 1965, scrapped 1965.
, cargo ship for PSNC, launched 2 April 1946, completed 16 August 1946.
, (Govan-built), oil tanker for British Admiralty, launched 4 April 1946, completed 27 August 1946 as |RFA Wave Chief, scrapped 1975.
, oil tanker for Anglo Saxon petroleum Co, launched 16 April 1946, completed 19 September 1946.
, oil tanker for British Tanker Co, launched 12 June 1946, completed 25 September 1946.
, bitumen tanker for Anglo Saxon Petroleum Co, launched 28 June 1945, completed 17 December 1946.
, Landing Ship, Tank Mk.3 for British Admiralty, launched 12 September 1945, completed 26 January 1946.
, oil tanker for Ministry of War Teansport, launched 4 October 1945, completed 24 December 1945.
, (Clyde-built), oil tanker for Ministry of War Transport, launched 31 October 1945, completed 7 February 1946, renamed British Pluck 1951, scrapped 1954.
, whale factory ship for United Whalers Ltd, launched 18 April 1946, completed 28 September 1946.
,  for Ministry of Transport, launched 5 June 1946, completed 2 August 1946. 
, L-class tug for Ministry of Transport, launched 12 June 1946, completed 2 August 1946. 
, L-class tug for Ministry of Transport, launched 4 July 1946, completed 2 August 1946. 
, L-class tug for Ministry of Transport, launched 4 July 1946, completed 2 August 1946. 
, L-class tug for Ministry of Transport, launched 17 August 1946, completed 18 September 1946. 
, L-class tug for Ministry of Transport, launched 17 August 1946, completed 18 September 1946. 
, cargo ship for Blue Funnel Line, launched 27 August 1946, completed 17 January 1947.
, cargo ship for French Line, launched 12 September 1946, completed 4 June 1947. 
, refrigerated cargo ship for Royal Mail Line, launched 24 September 1946, completed 29 May 1947.
, oil tanker for Anglo Saxon Petroleum Co, launched 26 September 1946, completed 6 February 1947.
, paddle steamer for London and North Eastern Railway, launched 2 October 1946, completed 5 June 1947.
, oil tanker for Anglo Saxon Petroleum Co, launched 11 October 1946, completed 25 March 1947.
, cargo ship for French Line, launched 21 November 1946, completed 3 July 1947. 
, passenger ship for Shaw Savill Line, launched 26 November 1946, completed 16 July 1947, maiden voyage 1 August 1947.
, refrigerated cargo ship for Royal Mail Line, launched 27 November 1946, completed 3 September 1947.f1
, cargo ship for French Line, launched 20 February 1947, completed 17 September 1947. 
, passenger ship for Cunard-White Star Line, launched 25 February 1947, completed 7 April 1948, maiden voyage 10 April 1948, renamed SS Remuera 1961 and SS Aramac 1965, scrapped 1970.
, cargo ship for PSNC, launched 7 March 1947, completed 18 November 1947.
, ferry for Coast Lines, launched 25 March 1947, completed 17 January 1948.
,  for British Admiralty, launched 22 April 1947, completed 1953, scrapped 1973.
, ferry for The China Navigation Company, launched 23 April 1947, completed 18 December 1947.
, ferry for Coast Lines, launched 20 May 1947, completed 25 March 1948.
, cargo ship for Moss Hutchinson Line, launched 3 June 1947, completed 19 November 1947.
, refrigerated cargo ship for Blue Star Line, launched 17 June 1947, completed 12 March 1948.
, whale factory ship for A/S Thor Dahl Ltd, launched 19 June 1947, completed 9 October 1947.
Pretoria Castle, passenger ship for Union Castle, launched 19 August 1947, completed 10 July 1948, renamed SS Oranje 1966. 
, cargo ship for PSNC, launched 29 August 1947, completed 20 March 1948.
, pilot tender for Trinity House, launched 2 September 1947, completed 28 January 1948.
, oil tanker for Anglo Saxon Petroleum Co, launched 30 September 1947, completed 30 December 1947.
, cargo ship for Moss Hutchinson Line, launched 2 October 1947, completed 30 January 1948.
, refrigerated cargo ship for Blue Star Line, launched 2 October 1947, completed 14 July 1948.
Edinburgh Castle, passenger ship for Union Castle, launched 16 October 1947, completed 26 November 1948. 
, pilot boat for Trinity House, launched 30 October 1947, completed 7 April 1948.
, oil tanker for British Tanker Co, launched 11 December 1947, completed 3 June 1948.
, lightship tender for Commissioners of Irish Lights, launched 14 February 1948, completed 18 July 1948.
, oil tanker for British Tanker Co, launched 27 February 1948, completed 7 July 1948.
, oil tanker for Anglo Saxon Petroleum Co, launched 11 March 1948, completed 7 September 1948.
, cargo ship for Holland America Line, launched 11 March 1948, completed 14 October 1948.
, passenger ship for Royal Mail Line, launched 11 May 1948, completed 18 February 1949, wrecked 25 April 1949 on maiden voyage.
, cargo ship for Ulster Steamship Co, launched 25 May 1948, completed 26 August 1948.
, whale catcher for United Whalers Ltd, launched 26 May 1948, completed 20 October 1948.
, oil tanker for British Tanker Co, launched 8 June 1948, completed 12 November 1948.
, cargo ship for Holland America Line, launched 10 June 1948, completed 19 February 1949.
, aircraft carrier for British Admiralty, launched 22 June 1948, completed 2 November 1953, scrapped 1984.
, oil tanker for A/S Bulls Rederi, launched 6 July 1948, completed 17 September 1948.
, whale catcher for United Whalers Ltd, launched 6 July 1948, completed 8 November 1948.
, ferry for British Railways, launched 22 July 1948, completed 5 April 1949, maiden voyage 14 April 1949, renamed Express Apollon 1976, scrapped 1980.
, oil tanker for British Tanker Co, launched 16 September 1948, completed 29 December 1948.
, ferry for British Railways, launched 21 September 1948, completed 17 May 1949, renamed Altaif 1976.
, ferry for Bombay Steam Navigation Co, launched 19 October 1948, completed 20 August 1949.
, ferry for Bombay Steam Navigation Co, launched 19 October 1948, completed 20 June 1949.
, cargo ship for Blue Funnel Line, launched 2 November 1948, completed 3 May 1949.
, oil tanker for Fred Olsen & Co, launched 4 November 1948, completed 31 March 1949.
, oil tanker for British Tanker Co, launched 16 November 1948, completed 24 March 1949.
, whale catcher for United Whalers Ltd, launched 28 December 1948, completed 18 August 1949.
, oil tanker for Estrella Maritima SA, launched 27 January 1949, completed 15 June 1949.
, oil tanker for Estrella Maritima SA, launched 15 February 1949, completed 6 July 1949.
, whale catcher for United Whalers Ltd, launched 17 February 1949, completed 2 September 1949.
, oil tanker for A/S Thor Thorsen, launched 17 March 1949, completed 27 June 1949.
, cargo ship for Moss Hutchinson Line, launched 29 March 1949, completed 6 July 1949.
, ferry for Bombay Steam Navigation Co, launched 29 March 1949, completed 20 October 1949.
, ferry for Bombay Steam Navigation Co, launched 30 March 1949, completed 20 October 1949.
, cargo ship for Blue Funnel Line, launched 13 April 1949, completed 29 October 1949.
, whale catcher for United Whalers Ltd, launched 24 May 1949, completed 19 September 1949.
, cargo ship for Moss Hutchinson Line, launched 31 May 1949, completed 12 October 1949.
, oil tanker for Panama City Tanker Co, launched 10 June 1949, completed 7 October 1949.
, whale catcher for United Whalers Ltd, launched 28 June 1949, completed 12 October 1949.
, cargo liner for Blue Funnel Line, launched 27 July 1949, completed 31 March 1950.
, whale catcher for Union Whaling Co, launched 28 July 1949, completed 4 November 1949.
, oil tanker for British Tanker Co, launched 11 August 1949, completed 25 November 1949.
, whale catcher for Union Whaling Co, launched 16 August 1949, completed as Arnt Karlsen 9 November 1949.
, passenger ship for Union Castle, launched 24 August 1949, completed 25 March 1950, maiden voyage 6 April 1950, renamed Patris 1959, Mediterranean Island 1979, Mediterranean Star 1981 and Terra 1988, scrapped 1989.
, oil tanker for A/S Truma, launched 22 September 1949, completed 27 January 1950.
, research trawler for South African Government, launched 10 October 1949, completed 27 January 1950.
, refrigerated cargo ship for Shaw Savill Line, launched 21 October 1949, completed 24 March 1950.
, oil tanker for Commons Bros Ltd, launched 26 October 1949, completed 24 February 1950.
, oil tanker for British Tanker Co, launched 21 November 1949, completed 23 February 1950.

1950s
, oil tanker for British Tanker Co, launched 2 February 1950, completed 9 June 1950.
, whale catcher for Australian Whaling Commission, launched 6 February 1950, completed 27 April 1950.
, refrigerated cargo ship for Shaw Savill Line, launched 7 March 1950, completed 5 July 1950.
, oil tanker for British Tanker Co, launched 21 March 1950, completed 8 July 1950.
, whale factory ship for Compania Argentina de Pesca, launched 4 April 1950, completed 15 October 1951.
, oil tanker for British Tanker Co, launched 1 June 1950, completed 28 September 1950.
, oil tanker for Borgestad A/S, launched 14 June 1950, completed 5 October 1950.
, cargo ship for Blue Funnel Line, launched 15 June 1950, completed 21 November 1950.
, oil tanker for Anglo Saxon Petroleum Co, launched 29 June 1950, completed 9 November 1950.
, cargo ship for Blue Funnel Line, launched 28 July 1950, completed 5 January 1951.
, oil tanker for British Tanker Co, launched 15 August 1950, completed 8 December 1950.
, oil tanker for Hunting & Sons, launched 26 September 1950, completed 29 December 1950.
, oil tanker for Per Gjerding, launched 28 September 1950, completed 19 December 1950.
, whale catcher for Falkland Shipowners Co, launched 28 September 1950, completed 27 November 1950.
, oil tanker for Fred Olsen & Co, launched 28 September 1950, completed 17 January 1951.
, oil tanker for Olav Ringdal, launched 12 December 1950, completed 12 March 1951.
, oil tanker for Sigval Bergsen, launched 12 January 1951, completed 15 May 1951.
, oil tanker for Moltzaua & Christensen, launched 8 February 1951, completed 17 April 1951.
, tug for East African Railways, launched 12 March 1951, completed 8 June 1951.
, passenger ship for Union Castle, launched 5 April 1951, completed 6 October 1951.
, whale catcher for United Whalers, launched 3 May 1951, completed 15 September 1951.
, oil tanker for Fred Olsen & Co, launched 5 May 1951, completed 6 October 1951.
, oil tanker for Sigurd Herlofsen A/S, launched 22 May 1951, completed 31 August 1951.
, tug for East African Railways, launched 23 May 1951, completed 15 September 1951.
, whale catcher for United Whalers, launched 7 June 1951, completed 11 October 1951.
, cargo ship for Port Line, launched 19 June 1951, completed 31 October 1951.
, passenger ship for Union Castle, launched 21 June 1951, completed 16 February 1952, renamed Amerikanis 1967, scrapped 2001.
, oil tanker for Lorentzen A/S, launched 2 July 1951, completed 12 November 1951.
, whale catcher for Hvalfinger A/S, launched 9 July 1951, completed 30 October 1951.
, cargo ship for Australia China Line, launched 2 August 1951, completed 20 December 1951.
, whale catcher for Union Whaling Co, launched 3 August 1951, completed 24 October 1951.
, whale catcher for Union Whaling Co, launched 23 August 1951, completed 15 November 1951.
, oil tanker for Societe Navale Delmas Vieljeux, launched 11 October 1951, completed 25 April 1952.
, cargo ship for Royal Mail Line, launched 29 November 1951, completed 12 June 1952.
, cargo ship for King Line, launched 29 November 1951, completed 29 February 1952.
, cargo ship for Ulster Steamship Co, launched 17 December 1951, completed 20 March 1952.
, oil tanker for British Tanker Co, launched 16 January 1952, completed 12 June 1952.
, cargo ship for Elder Dempster, launched 29 January 1952, completed 5 June 1952.
, cargo ship for King Line, launched 14 February 1952, completed 6 May 1952.
, cargo ship for Royal Mail Line, launched 25 March 1952, completed 11 September 1952.
, oil tanker for Spermacet Whaling Co, launched 25 March 1952, completed 9 July 1952.
, passenger ship for Union Castle, launched 5 April 1952, completed 8 November 1952.
, ferry for Coast Lines, launched 8 May 1952, completed 17 October 1952.
, refrigerated cargo ship for Shaw Savill Line, launched 22 May 1952, completed 11 November 1952.
, whale catcher for Tongsberg A/S, launched 10 June 1952, completed 5 September 1952.
, cargo ship for Elder Dempster, launched 24 June 1952, completed 12 November 1952.
, oil tanker for Spermacet Whaling Co, launched 8 July 1952, completed 30 January 1953.
, cargo ship for Lamport & Holt, launched 6 August 1952, completed 28 November 1952.
, oil tanker for Hunting & Sons, launched 16 September 1952, completed 21 January 1953.
, refrigerated cargo ship for Shaw Savill Line, launched 5 November 1952, completed 15 May 1953.
, cargo ship for King Line, launched 19 November 1952, completed 19 March 1953.
, cargo ship for Bank Line, launched 3 December 1952, completed 26 February 1953.
, cargo ship for Bank Line, launched 18 December 1952, completed 24 June 1953.
, oil tanker for Blandford Shipping, launched 19 December 1952, completed 14 May 1953.
, oil tanker for Anglo Saxon Petroleum Co, launched 29 January 1953, completed 11 June 1953.
, (Clyde-built), ferry for British Railways, launched 4 March 1953, completed 1 June 1953, renamed City of Piraeus 1975 and City of Corfu 1993.
, (Clyde-built), paddle steamer for British Railways, launched 5 March 1953, completed 4 May 1953.
, (Clyde-built), ferry for British Railways, launched 2 April 1953, completed 24 June 1953, renamed Ala 1976.
, oil tanker for A/S Field, launched 15 April 1953, completed 8 July 1953.
, oil tanker for Arthur H Mathieson, launched 12 May 1953, completed 17 September 1953.
, cargo ship for Bank Line, launched 29 June 1953, completed 14 October 1953.
, whale catcher for Hector Whaling Ltd, launched 15 July 1953, completed 19 November 1953.
, cargo ship for Ulster Steamship Co, launched 10 August 1953, completed 4 November 1953.
, oil tanker for Anders Jahre A/S, launched 23 October 1953, completed 9 January 1954.
, cargo ship for Blue Funnel Line, launched 11 November 1953, completed 22 April 1954.
, oil tanker for A/S Kosmos, launched 25 August 1953, completed 20 November 1953.
, refrigerated cargo ship for Port Line, launched 22 September 1953, completed 4 February 1954.
, cargo ship for Union Castle, launched 22 October 1953, completed 5 March 1954.
, oil tanker for British Tanker Co, launched 24 November 1953, completed 30 April 1954.
,  for British Admiralty, launched 27 November 1953, completed 21 May 1954, scrapped 1975.
, oil tanker for British Tanker Co, launched 9 December 1953, completed 1 July 1954.
, oil tanker for British Tanker Co, launched 9 December 1953, completed 6 May 1954.
, cargo ship for Royal Mail Line, launched 19 January 1954, completed 27 June 1954.
, passenger ship for P&O, launched 21 January 1954, completed 10 September 1954, maiden voyage 15 September 1954, scrapped 1973.
, collier for John Kelly Ltd, launched 3 February 1954, completed 7 May 1954.
, cargo ship for Union Castle, launched 4 February 1954, completed 5 June 1954.
, Ton-class minesweeper for British Admiralty, launched 18 February 1954, completed 21 August 1954, scrapped 1991.
, seaward defence craft for British Admiralty, launched 19 February 1954, completed 8 May 1954.
YC 327, lighter for British Admiralty, launched 19 March 1954, completed 1 July 1954.
, seaward defence craft for British Admiralty, launched 2 April 1954, completed 10 September 1954.
, oil tanker for British Tanker Co, launched 14 April 1954 completed 20 August 1954.
, Ton-class minesweeper for British Admiralty, launched 18 May 1954, completed 10 March 1955, scrapped 1985.
, ship for Pelagos A/S, launched 2 June 1954, completed 15 September 1954.
, oil tanker for Hadley Shipping Co, launched 29 June 1954, completed 9 November 1954.
,  for British Admiralty, launched 1 July 1954, completed 10 May 1956, scrapped 1987.
, Ton-class minesweeper for British Admiralty, launched 30 July 1954, completed 10 March 1955, scrapped 1970.
, passenger ship for Shaw Savill Line, launched 17 August 1954, delivered 28 February 1955, renamed Calypso 1973, Calypso I 1980, ''Azure Seas 1981 and Ocean Breeze 1992, scrapped 2003.
, fleet tanker for Royal Australian Navy, launched 1 September 1954, completed 17 May 1955, renamed RFA Tide Austral 1955 and HMAS Supply 1962.
, oil tanker for Belships Co, launched 28 September 1954, completed 24 February 1955.
, cargo ship for Blue Funnel Line, launched 29 September 1954, completed 5 January 1955.
, cargo ship for Elder Dempster, launched 14 October 1954, completed 21 January 1955.
, Ton-class minesweeper for British Admiralty, launched 26 October 1954, completed 29 June 1955, scrapped 1971.
, cargo ship for Prince Line, launched 29 December 1954, completed 27 April 1955.
Harlandic II, launch for Harland and Woolf, launched 1953.
, Ton-class minesweeper for British Admiralty, launched 2 March 1955, completed 25 August 1955, scrapped 1972.
, refrigerated cargo ship for Port Line, launched 10 March 1955, completed 7 July 1955.
, cargo ship for Bank Line, launched 24 March 1955, completed 4 August 1955.
, cargo ship for British Phosphate Carriers, launched 21 April 1955, completed 21 October 1955.
, coaster for Belfast Steamship Co, launched 26 April 1955, completed 20 September 1955.
, oil tanker for Shell Oil Co, launched 5 May 1955, completed 20 October 1955.
, Ton-class minesweeper for British Admiralty, launched 23 May 1955, completed 25 November 1955.
SS Reina Del Mar, passenger ship for PSNC, launched 7 June 1955, completed 8 April 1956, maiden voyage 3 May 1956.
, cargo ship for Royal Mail Line, launched 5 July 1955, completed 14 December 1955.
, cargo ship for Bank Line, launched 5 July 1955, completed 27 October 1955.
, oil tanker for Shell Oil Co, launched 6 July 1955, completed 21 December 1955.
, cargo ship for Blue Funnel Line, launched 4 August 1955, completed 5 January 1956.
, Ton-class minesweeper for British Admiralty, launched 31 August 1955, completed 1 June 1956, renamed Tahan 1966.
, refrigerated cargo ship for Royal Mail Line, launched 19 October 1955, completed 1 February 1956. 
,  for British Admiralty, launched 15 November 1955, completed 19 March 1956.
, cargo ship for Prince Line, launched 16 November 1955, completed 8 March 1956.
, oil tanker for Knut Knudsen A/S, launched 17 November 1955, completed 11 April 1956.
, ferry for British Railways, launched 1 December 1955, completed 22 August 1956.
, cargo ship for Elder Dempster, launched 15 December 1955, completed 26 April 1956.
, ferry for British Railways, launched 12 January 1956, 1956, completed 22 September 1956, renamed Neptunia 1975, Corinthia 1987, Faith Power 1994, Fairy Princess 1995 and Zenith.
, Confiance-class tug for British Admiralty, launched 17 January 1956, completed 6 September 1956. 
, Ton-class minesweeper for British Admiralty, launched 27 January 1956, completed 8 November 1956, scrapped 1975.
, lighter for Shell Oil, launched 31 January 1956, completed 23 March 1956.
, oil tanker for Sigval Bergsen, launched 2 March 1956, completed 13 June 1956.
, cargo ship for Johnston Warren & Co, launched 27 March 1956, completed 27 June 1956.
, oil tanker for Shell Oil Co, launched 26 April 1956, completed 20 September 1956.
, Ton-class minesweeper for British Admiralty, launched 1 May 1956, completed 11 December 1957.
, Ton-class minesweeper for British Admiralty, launched 24 May 1956, completed 19 February 1957, scrapped 1989.
, cargo ship for Elder Dempster, launched 7 June 1956, completed 24 October 1956.
, refrigerated cargo ship for Royal Mail Line, launched 21 June 1956, completed 25 October 1956. 
, oil tanker for Texaco Oil Co, launched 7 August 1956, completed 26 January 1957. 
, ferry for Coast Lines, launched 21 August 1956, completed 1 March 1957.
, Ton-class minesweeper for British Admiralty, launched 22 October 1956, completed 21 August 1957, scrapped 1995.
, tug for Clyde Shipping Co, launched 23 May 1956, completed 29 October 1956.
, refrigerated cargo ship for Royal Mail Line, launched 1 November 1956, completed 13 February 1957.
, oil tanker for Sigval Bergsen, launched 20 November 1956, completed 31 January 1957.
, refrigerated cargo ship for Port Line, launched 21 November 1956, completed 12 March 1957.
, tug for Clyde Shipping Co, launched 29 November 1956, completed 17 May 1957.
, cargo ship for Bank Line, launched 21 December 1956, completed 7 March 1957.
, ore carrier for Commons Bros Ltd, launched 14 February 1957, completed 20 June 1957.
, Whitby-class frigate for British Admiralty, launched 14 February 1957, completed 14 August 1958, scrapped 1978.
, cargo ship for Bank Line, launched 15 February 1957, completed 7 June 1957.
, T2 tanker of Esso Petroleum Co, new midsection launched 14 March 1957, completed 17 August 1957.
, cargo ship for King Line, launched 15 March 1957, completed 25 June 1957.
, oil tanker for Shell Oil, launched 16 April 1957, completed 4 July 1957.
, refrigerated cargo ship for Royal Mail Line, launched 30 April 1957, completed 22 August 1957.
, refrigerated cargo ship for Royal Mail Line, launched 29 May 1957, completed 26 September 1957.
, cargo ship for Bank Line, launched 30 May 1957, completed 27 September 1957.
, refrigerated cargo ship for Royal Mail Line, launched 9 August 1957, completed 30 December 1957.
, cargo ship for King Line, launched 27 August 1957, completed 19 December 1957.
, cargo ship for Bank Line, launched 28 August 1957, completed 17 January 1958.
, Confiance-class tug for British Admiralty, launched 10 September 1957, completed 15 October 1958.
, oil tanker for British Tanker Co, launched 25 September 1957, completed 31 January 1958.
, cargo ship for Shaw Savill Line, launched 8 October 1957, completed 13 February 1958.
, refrigerated cargo ship for Port Line, launched 22 November 1957, completed 26 March 1958.
, tug for Clyde Shipping Co, launched 11 December 1957, completed 27 March 1958.
, passenger ship for Union Castle, launched 24 December 1957, completed 14 November 1958, maiden voyage 1 January 1959, renamed Ocean Queen, Sinbad and Sinbad I, scrapped 1980.
, cargo ship for Bank Line, launched 27 December 1957, completed 2 April 1958.
, ore carrier for Vallum Shipping Co, launched 20 January 1958, completed 22 May 1958.
, oil tanker for Sigval Bergsen, launched 7 March 1958, completed 11 July 1958.
, oil tanker for Texaco Oil Co, launched 20 March 1958, completed 13 September 1958. 
, phosphate carrier for British Phosphate Carriers, launched 15 May 1958, completed 31 October 1958.
, coaster for Associated Humber Lines, launched 19 May 1958, completed 8 October 1958.
, Whitby-class frigate for Indian Navy, launched 18 June 1958, completed 14 January 1960.
, cargo ship for Bank Line, launched 19 June 1958, completed 25 September 1958.
,cargo ship for Ulster Steamship Co, launched 2 July 1958, completed 18 November 1958.
, Ton-class minesweeper, launched 3 July 1958, completed 11 February 1959 for South African Navy, commissioned as SAS Mosselbaai.
, cargo ship for King Line, launched 15 August 1958, completed 5 December 1958.
, cargo ship for British India Steam Navigation Co, launched 25 September 1958, completed 26 March 1959.
, Confiance-class tug for British Admiralty, launched 16 October 1958, completed 17 June 1959.
, Ton-class minesweeper, launched 8 November 1958, completed 10 July 1958. Commissioned into South African Navy as SAS Port Elizabeth.
, oil tanker for British Tanker Co, launched 27 November 1958, completed 18 April 1959.
, coaster for Associated Humber Lines, launched 2 December 1958, completed 16 April 1959.
, Ton-class minesweeper, launched 10 December 1958, completed 21 May 1959. Commissioned into South African Navy as SAS Walvisbaai.
, cargo ship for Manchester Liners Ltd, launched 12 December 1958, completed 19 March 1959.
, cargo ship for Bank Line, launched 30 December 1958, completed 3 April 1959.
, cargo ship for British India Steam Navigation Co, launched 22 January 1959, completed 27 August 1959.
, cargo ship for bank Line, launched 27 January 1959, completed 2 May 1959.
, refrigerated cargo ship for Blue Star Line, launched 26 February 1959, completed 3 July 1959, scrapped 1979.
, cargo ship for PSNC, launched 9 April 1959, completed 10 July 1959.
, oil tanker for Hunting & Sons, launched 21 May 1959, completed 22 December 1959.
, oil tanker for British Tanker Co, launched 22 May 1959, completed 15 November 1959.
, cargo ship for Bank Line, launched 5 June 1959, completed 24 September 1959.
, passenger ship for Royal Mail Line, launched 7 July 1959, completed 31 December 1959, maiden voyage January 1960.
, coaster for Associated Humber Lines, launched 8 July 1959, completed 14 November 1959.
, cargo liner for Royal Mail Lines, launched 20 October 1959, completed 12 April 1960, maiden voyage 29 April 1960.
, oil tanker for British Tanker Co, launched 3 November 1959, completed 6 May 1960.
,  for British Admiralty, launched 15 December 1959, completed 9 June 1961, sunk as target 1986.
, oil tanker for British tanker Co, launched 29 December 1959, completed 29 April 1960.
, cargo ship for Bank Line, launched 29 December 1959, completed 28 April 1960.

1960s
, oil tanker for PSNC, launched 15 January 1960, completed 1 July 1960.
, bulk carrier for Sigval Bergsen, launched 1 March 1960, completed 11 June 1960.
, cargo ship for British India Steam Navigation Co, launched 10 March 1960, completed 19 September 1960.
, launched 16 March 1960, completed 19 May 1961, maiden voyage 6 June 1961, scrapped 1997.
, Refrigerated cargo liner for Royal Mail Lines, launched 13 April 1960, completed 23 September 1960, maiden voyage 7 October 1960.
, ore carrier for Hindustan Shipping Co, launched 25 May 1960, completed 1 November 1960.
, refrigerated cargo ship for Shaw Savill Line, launched 23 June 1960, completed 19 December 1960.
, oil tanker for Stevinson Hardy & Co, launched 24 August 1960, completed 27 February 1961.
, cargo ship for British India Steam Navigation Co, launched 6 September 1960, completed 30 January 1961.
, cargo ship for Bank Line, launched 6 October 1960, completed 13 January 1961.
, bulk carrier for Sigval Bergsen, launched 23 November 1960, completed 8 April 1961.
MV Clyde, launch for Clyde Navigation Trust, launched 14 December 1960, completed 13 March 1961.
, oil tanker for Norsk Braendselojle A/S, launched 20 December 1960, completed 28 April 1961.
, oil tanker for British Tanker Co, launched 19 January 1961, completed 6 July 1961.
, oil tanker for Sigval Bergsen, launched 31 January 1961, completed 30 May 1961.
, refrigerated cargo ship for Port Line, Launched 1 March 1961, completed 8 September 1961.
, oil tanker for PSNC, launched 17 March 1961, completed 6 July 1961.
, cargo ship for British India Steam Navigation Co, launched 29 March 1961, completed 28 August 1961.
, cargo ship for Bank Line, launched 28 April 1961, completed 11 August 1961.
, refrigerated cargo ship for Port Line, launched 31 May 1961, completed 20 October 1961.
,  for British Admiralty, launched 28 June 1961, completed 28 March 1963, sunk as target 1989.
, oil tanker for British Tanker Co, launched 24 August 1961, completed 12 January 1962.
, dredger for British Transport Commission, launched 24 August 1961, completed 4 April 1962.
,  for British Admiralty, launched 27 September 1961, completed 17 August 1963, scrapped 1998.
, cargo ship for Bank Line, launched 26 October 1961, completed 26 January 1962.
, oil tanker for British Tanker Co, launched 23 November 1961, completed 19 May 1962.
, cargo ship for Bank Line, launched 21 December 1961, completed 12 April 1962.
, oil tanker for British Tanker Co, launched 9 January 1962, completed 7 June 1962.
, oil tanker for Texaco Oil Co, launched 5 April 1962, completed 23 November 1962.
MV Port Nicholson, refrigerated cargo ship for Port Line, launched 4 May 1962, completed 9 November 1962.
, dredger for British Transport Commission, launched 17 May 1962, completed 29 March 1963.
, cargo ship for Ringals Rederi A/S, launched 31 May 1962, completed 29 September 1962.
, cargo ship for Belships Co, launched 26 September 1962, completed 23 January 1963.
, oil tanker for British Tanker Co, launched 28 September 1962, completed 28 June 1963.
, cargo ship for Bank Line, launched 25 January 1963, completed 3 July 1963.
, cargo ship for Bank Line, launched 21 June 1963, completed 31 October 1963.
, oil tanker for Sigval Bergsen, launched 19 August 1963, completed 18 December 1963.
, LNG carrier for Methane Tanker Finance Co, launched 19 September 1963, completed 26 May 1964.
, assault ship for British Admiralty, launched 19 December 1963, completed 27 November 1965, scrapped 2007.
, cargo ship for Bank Line, launched 31 December 1963, completed 26 March 1964.
, cargo ship for Bank Line, launched 27 January 1964, completed 20 May 1964.
, cargo ship for Bank Line, launched 25 June 1964, completed 9 September 1964.
, oil tanker for Texaco (Panama) Inc., launched 6 August 1964, completed 14 January 1965.
, oil tanker for British tanker Co, launched 23 September 1964, completed 26 March 1965.
, oil tanker for Eden Tankers Ltd, launched 5 March 1965, completed 2 July 1967.
, Leander-class frigate for Royal New Zealand Navy, launched 18 February 1965, completed 19 September 1966, scuttled 2000.
, oil tanker for British Tanker Co, launched 15 June 1965, completed 11 January 1966.
, bulk carrier for Buries Marks Ltd, launched 30 June 1965, completed 30 September 1965.
, bulk carrier for Buries Marks Ltd, launched 24 November 1965, completed 12 February 1966.
, motor barge for Scott (Toombridge) Ltd, launched 1965.
, oil tanker for Shell International Marine, launched 25 January 1966, completed 30 March 1966.
RFA Regent, fleet oiler for British Admiralty, launched 9 March 1966, completed 6 June 1967, scrapped 1993.
, cargo ship for Bank Line, launched 6 May 1966, completed 7 July 1966.
, oil tanker for Shell International Marine, launched 5 July 1966, completed 16 December 1966.
, ferry for Coast Lines, launched 13 October 1966, completed 6 April 1967.
, bulk carrier for Norwegian Bulk Carriers, launched 25 April 1967, completed 29 August 1967.
, cargo ship for Bank Line, launched 24 May 1967, completed 15 August 1967.
, supertanker for Deutsche Shell AG, launched 6 September 1967, completed 24 April 1968.
, bulk carrier for Norwegian Bulk Carriers, launched 21 November 1967, completed 1 March 1968.
, cargo ship for Bank Line, launched 1 December 1967, completed 30 January 1968.
, Leander-class frigate for British Admiralty, launched 28 February 1968, completed 6 June 1969, sunk as target 1993.
, bulk carrier for Norwegian Bulk Carriers, launched 14 May 1968, completed 28 August 1968.
, bulk carrier for Norwegian Bulk Carriers, launched 9 August 1968, completed 29 October 1968.
, bulk carrier for CH Sorensen, launched 18 March 1969, completed 16 May 1969.

1970s
, bulk carrier for Buries Marks Ltd, launched 22 January 1970, completed 13 May 1970.
, bulk carrier for Kriship Shipping Co, launched 6 May 1970, completed 14 September 1970.
, oil tanker for Esso Petroleum Co, launched 11 May 1970, completed 6 October 1970.
, bulk carrier for Bowring Shipping Ltd, launched 2 June 1970, completed 10 September 1970.
, bulk carrier for Ropner Shipping, launched 11 December 1960, completed 1 March 1971.
, oil tanker for Esso Petroleum Co, launched 29 May 1971, completed 6 September 1971.
, bulk carrier for Ropner Shipping, launched 8 October 1971, completed 7 December 1971.
, bulk carrier for Mascot A/S, launched 18 December 1971, completed 18 February 1972.
, bulk carrier for Mascot A/S, launched 26 April 1972, completed 30 June 1972.
, supertanker for Carlow Maritime Panama, launched 7 October 1972, completed 24 November 1972.
, oil tanker for Lakeport Navigation Co, launched 4 August 1973, completed 7 September 1973.
, bulk carrier for Furness Withy, launched 1 October 1973, completed 16 November 1973.
, supertanker for Worldwide Shipping Co, launched 23 March 1974, completed 12 June 1974.
, bulk carrier for Bibby Shipping, launched 6 October 1974, completed 29 November 1974.
, supertanker for Shell Tankers Ltd, launched 13 December 1974, completed 27 February 1975.
, supertanker for Shell Tankers Ltd, launched 5 July 1975, completed 17 November 1975.
, bulk carrier for Ruud Pedersen A/S, launched 8 October 1975, completed 5 January 1976.
, supertanker for Shell Tankers Ltd, launched 27 January 1976, completed 26 July 1976.
, supertanker for Shell Tankers Ltd, launched 2 July 1976, completed 30 December 1976.
, supertanker for Shell Tankers Ltd, launched 11 December 1976, completed 3 June 1977.
, bulk carrier for Ropner Shipping, launched 21 March 1977, completed 5 July 1977.
, supertanker for Woodstock Shipping Co, launched 18 June 1977, completed 25 March 1980.
, supertanker for Pomona Shipping Co, launched 27 January 1978, completed 25 March 1980.
, bulk carrier for Ropner Shipping, launched 24 June 1978, completed 31 October 1978.
, products tanker for Furness Withy, launched 6 October 1978, completed 20 June 1979.
, products tanker for Furness Withy, launched 27 January 1979, completed 24 October 1979.
, ferry for Sealink, launched 24 May 1979, completed 22 April 1980.
, bulk carrier for British Steel Corporation, launched 7 September 1979, completed 14 December 1979.
MV St Anselm, ferry for Sealink, launched 5 December 1979, completed 16 October 1980.

1980s
, ferry for Sealink, launched 20 March 1980, completed 6 March 1981.
MV St David, ferry for Sealink, launched 25 September 1980, completed 24 July 1981.
, LPG carrier for Shell Tankers Ltd, launched 21 March 1981, completed 30 April 1982.
, LPG carrier for Shell Tankers Ltd, launched 23 January 1982, completed 29 October 1982.
, oil tanker for British Petroleum, launched 3 July 1982, completed 26 April 1983.
, oil tanker for British Petroleum, launched 28 March 1983, completed 14 February 1984.
, bulk carrier for British Steel Corporation, launched 28 January 1984, completed 19 October 1984.
, refrigerated cargo ship for Blue Star Line, launched 23 September 1984, completed 7 January 1986.
, refrigerated cargo ship for Blue Star Line, launched 23 September 1984, completed 2 April 1985.
, refrigerated cargo ship for Blue Star Line, launched 4 March 1985, completed 21 January 1986.
, refrigerated cargo ship for Blue Star Line, launched 1 July 1985, completed 4 February 1986.
, bulk carrier for British Steel Corporation, completed 23 September 1987.
 SWOPS ship for BP Petroleum Development, completed 1987.

1990s
, Fleet replenishment ship for British Admiralty, launched 12 June 1990, completed 24 June 1994.
, Suezmax tanker for Fred Olsen & Co, completed 3 January 1992. 
, Suezmax tanker for Fred Olsen & Co, launched 30 April 1992, completed 10 July 1992.
, Suezmax tanker for Fred Olsen & Co, launched 10 October 1992, completed 15 January 1993.
, Suezmax tanker for Fred Olsen & Co, launched 5 June 1993, completed 30 June 1993.
, bulk carrier for China Navigation Company, launched 20 January 1994, completed 5 April 1994.
, Suezmax tanker for Fred Olsen & Co, launched 11 June 1994, completed 21 October 1994.
Lowlands Trassey, bulk carrier for Trassey Shipping (Fred Olsen), launched 28 April 1995, completed 12 May 1995.
Knock Muir, Suezmax tanker for Fred Olsen & Co, launched 8 January 1996, completed 30 January 1996.
, oil tanker for Fred Olsen & Co, launched 13 June 1996, completed 30 September 1996.
Seillean, SWOPS vessel for British Petroleum, launched 1 August 1996, completed 1 March 1998.
, ultra deep water drillship for Global Marine Ltd, launched 23 September 1999, completed 16 March 2000.

2000s
, ultra deep water drillship for Global Marine Ltd, completed 1 August 2000.
, ferry for Bank Line, launched 1 August 2002, completed 17 January 2003.
, ferry for the Bank Line, launched 6 September 2002, completed 10 December 2002.

See also
List of ships built by Harland and Wolff (1859-1929)

References

Harland and Wolff
Harland and Wolff